"The Spaghetti Incident?" is the fifth studio album by the American hard rock band Guns N' Roses. The album is composed of covers of older punk rock, hard rock, and other songs.  "The Spaghetti Incident?" is the only studio album to feature rhythm guitarist Gilby Clarke, who replaced original Guns N' Roses member Izzy Stradlin during the band's Use Your Illusion tour in 1991, as well as the last album to feature guitarist Slash, bassist Duff McKagan, and drummer Matt Sorum, following their departures in 1996 and 1997, respectively. It is also their final album to date featuring longtime producer Mike Clink.

It is the only album released not backed by a tour. Although somewhat well received critically, it is the band's worst-selling studio album, having sold one million copies in the United States by 2018.

Background 
Initially, the band planned to release an EP of covers in 1992 or 1993, but decided to record a full album. Many of the tracks were recorded during the same sessions as the Illusions albums, which were originally intended to produce three or four albums. Izzy Stradlin's guitar parts were reportedly re-recorded entirely by Gilby Clarke. Slash described the recording as "spontaneous and unpainted", and recording the songs served as "a purpose to alleviate the pressure of making the Illusions records". The band wanted to increase the profile of some of their favorite bands and help them financially via royalties with the tracklist selection, and considered naming the album "Pension Fund".

The album is a collection of punk and glam rock covers. The album features covers of songs of punk artists such as U.K. Subs, The Damned, New York Dolls, The Stooges, Dead Boys, Misfits, Johnny Thunders, The Professionals, FEAR, as well as T. Rex, Soundgarden and The Skyliners. The lead single, "Ain't It Fun" featured Hanoi Rocks singer Michael Monroe as a guest vocalist.

During the studio sessions the band also recorded instrumental tracks of the song titled "Beer and a Cigarette", originally by Hanoi Rocks. The vocals were not recorded and the song was left off the record because the band did not want songwriter Andy McCoy to receive any money. The band also did an instrumental version of the song "Down on the Street" by The Stooges which also was never released.

Title
The title references an incident Steven Adler had in 1989 while the band was temporarily staying at an apartment in Chicago. Adler stored his drugs in a refrigerator next to the band's takeout containers, which contained Italian food. McKagan explained that Adler's code word for his stash was 'spaghetti'. In his lawsuit against the band, Adler's lawyer asked the band to "tell us about the spaghetti incident," which the band found amusing and used as the title of the album.

Controversy
The album includes a hidden track, a cover of "Look at Your Game, Girl", originally by cult leader Charles Manson. The track was kept secret and left off advance tapes sent to reviewers. The inclusion of the song caused controversy, with law enforcement and victims' rights groups expressing outrage. Rose stated "...we wanted to downplay it. We don't give any credit to Charles Manson on the album". Label president David Geffen commented: "[If] Rose had realized how offensive people would find this, he would not have ever recorded this song." Slash mentioned that the song was "done with naive and innocent black humor on our part". Rose stated he would donate all performance royalties from the song to a nonprofit environmental organization. The band was going to remove the song before learning that royalties would be donated to the son of one of Manson's victims. Geffen Records stated their share of royalties would be donated to the Doris Tate Crime Victims Bureau.

Live performances
Although Guns N' Roses never toured in support of "The Spaghetti Incident?", some of the songs were performed live prior to its release. The first track, "Since I Don't Have You", was performed a few times as an intro to songs "Sweet Child o' Mine" or "Paradise City" in 1992 and 1993. "Down on the Farm" was performed once in its full length during the 1990 performance in the Farm Aid IV show. It was also played a few times during the Chinese Democracy Tour in 2006. The band performed "Hair of the Dog" once in 1988, and again in 1990, during the only known "The Gak" (band featuring members of Guns N' Roses, Metallica and Skid Row) performance. "Attitude" was performed frequently during the Use Your Illusion Tour, and Duff still plays it in Loaded and his solo career. Other songs played live by Duff McKagan are "New Rose", "You Can't Put Your Arms Around a Memory" and "Raw Power". 

The other songs were never played live by Guns N' Roses, but might have been played by some of the members' side projects, like Matt Sorum's supergroup Camp Freddy, that plays cover versions of famous songs, as well as Neurotic Outsiders, the supergroup Duff McKagan and Matt Sorum were part of. Guns N' Roses played "Attitude" and - for the first time - "Raw Power" live in Buenos Aires (Argentina) in April 2014 with Duff McKagan on vocals. "Attitude", "Raw Power" and "New Rose" were played during the Not in This Lifetime... Tour.

Commercial performance and reception

"The Spaghetti Incident?" debuted at No. 4 on the Billboard 200, selling about 190,000 albums in its first week of release, significantly fewer than their previous releases. The album was certified platinum by RIAA on January 26, 1994.

In his retrospective review for AllMusic, music critic Stephen Thomas Erlewine said that, "As punk albums go, "The Spaghetti Incident?" lacks righteous anger and rage. As Guns N' Roses albums go, it's a complete delight, returning to the ferocious, hard-rocking days of Appetite for Destruction."

Track listing

Personnel

Credits are adapted from the album's liner notes.

Guns N' Roses
W. Axl Rose – lead vocals, keyboards on "Since I Don't Have You", kazoo on "Human Being"
Slash – lead guitar, co-lead vocals on "Buick Mackane (Big Dumb Sex)", talkbox on "Hair of the Dog", backing vocals on "Attitude"
Duff McKagan – bass, backing vocals, acoustic guitar, lead vocals on "You Can't Put Your Arms Around a Memory", "New Rose" and "Attitude", co-lead vocals on "Raw Power", drums on "You Can't Put Your Arms Around A Memory", production
Matt Sorum – drums, percussion on "Hair of the Dog", backing vocals on "Human Being" and "Attitude"
Dizzy Reed – keyboards, piano on "Since I Don't Have You", percussion on "Look at Your Game Girl", backing vocals on "You Can't Put Your Arms Around a Memory"
Gilby Clarke – rhythm guitar, backing vocals
Izzy Stradlin – rhythm guitar (uncredited)

Production
Mike Clink – production on all tracks except 1 and 11
Jim Mitchell – production on track 11
Bill Price – mixing
George Marino – mastering
Kevin Reagan – art direction; graphic design
Dennis Keeley, Gene Kirkland & Robert John – photography

Additional musicians
Michael Monroe – co-lead vocals on "Ain't It Fun"
Mike Staggs – additional guitar on "Ain't It Fun"
Mike Fasano – percussion on "Hair of the Dog"
Richard Duguay – lead and rhythm guitars on "You Can't Put Your Arms Around a Memory"
Eddie Huletz – backing vocals on "You Can't Put Your Arms Around a Memory"
Blake Stanton – backing vocals on "I Don't Care About You"
Eric Mills – backing vocals on "I Don't Care About You"
Rikki Rachtman – backing vocals on "I Don't Care About You"
Stuart Bailey – backing vocals on "I Don't Care About You"
Carlos Booy – acoustic guitar on "Look at Your Game, Girl"

Charts

Weekly charts

Year-end charts

Certifications

See also 
 List of number-one albums in Australia during the 1990s

Notes

References

Further reading

External links 
 

1993 albums
Covers albums
Guns N' Roses albums
Albums produced by Mike Clink
Geffen Records albums
Metaphors referring to spaghetti
Obscenity controversies in music